The 1967 European Amateur Team Championship took place 22–25 June at Circolo Golf Torino – La Mandria, 18 kilometres north of central Turin, Italy. It was the fifth men's golf European Amateur Team Championship.

Format 
All participating teams played one qualification round of stroke-play with up to six players, counted the five best scores for each team.

The eight best teams formed flight A, in knock-out match-play over the next three days. The teams were seeded based on their position after the stroke play. Each of the four best placed teams were drawn to play the quarter final against one of the teams in the flight placed in the next four positions. In each match between two nation teams, two 18-hole foursome games and five 18-hole single games were played. Teams were allowed to switch players during the team matches, selecting other players in to the afternoon single games after the morning foursome games.

The eight teams placed 9–16 in the qualification stroke-play formed Flight, B to play a similar knock-out play to decide their final positions.

Teams 
16 nation teams contested the event. Each team consisted of a minimum of five players.

Players in the leading teams

Other participating teams

Winners 
Defending champions team Ireland won the gold medal, beating team France 4–3 in the final. England earned the bronze on third place, after beating Scotland 4.5–2.5 in the bronze match.

Individual leaders in the opening 18-hole stroke-play qualifying competition was Tom Craddock, Ireland, and Charlie Green, Scotland, tied on first place, each with a score of 3-under-par 69. There was no official award for the lowest individual scores.

Results 
Qualification round

Team standings

* Note: In the event of a tie the order was determined by the better non-counting score.

Individual leaders

 Note: There was no official award for the lowest individual score.

Flight A

Bracket

Final games

Flight B

Bracket

Final standings

Sources:

See also 

 Eisenhower Trophy – biennial world amateur team golf championship for men organized by the International Golf Federation.
 European Ladies' Team Championship – European amateur team golf championship for women organised by the European Golf Association.

References

External links 
European Golf Association: Full results

European Amateur Team Championship
Golf tournaments in Italy
European Amateur Team Championship
European Amateur Team Championship
European Amateur Team Championship